Ruslan Romanchuk (born 12 October 1974) is a retired Ukrainian football midfielder.

References

1974 births
Living people
Ukrainian footballers
FC Chornomorets Odesa players
FC Chornomorets-2 Odesa players
FC Kremin Kremenchuk players
FC Nyva Vinnytsia players
FC Gütersloh 2000 players
TuS Celle FC players
FC Hoverla Uzhhorod players
FC Taraz players
FC Spartak Sumy players
FC Dnister Ovidiopol players
Ukrainian Premier League players
Ukrainian First League players
Ukrainian Second League players
Association football midfielders
Ukrainian expatriate footballers
Expatriate footballers in Germany
Ukrainian expatriate sportspeople in Germany
Expatriate footballers in Kazakhstan
Ukrainian expatriate sportspeople in Kazakhstan
2. Bundesliga players
Footballers from Odesa